Inge Wersin-Lantschner, née Inge Lantschner (26 January 1905 in Innsbruck – 16 June 1997 in Innsbruck) was an Austrian alpine skier and world champion. 

Wersin-Lantschner received three gold medals at the 1933 World Championships in Innsbruck, winning the slalom, the downhill and combined events.

References

External links

1905 births
1997 deaths
Sportspeople from Innsbruck
Austrian female alpine skiers
20th-century Austrian women